The Ameri-Go-Round was the name given to two carousels, one at each of Marriot's Great America amusement parks, Six Flags Great America in Gurnee, Illinois and California's Great America in Santa Clara, California. 

Marriott's Great America parks were unusual at the time because they were among the few parks with two carousels within the park. Each park had a carousel called the Columbia Carousel at the front of the park in addition to the Ameri-Go-Rounds.

Gurnee Ameri-Go-Round 
Gurnee's Ameri-Go-Round was built by the Dentzel Carousel Company in 1922 for Fontaine Ferry Park in Louisville, Kentucky. It was sold to Great America when Fontaine Ferry closed in 1969, and operated at Great America until 2003. 

It's a Deluxe Menagerie model 3-Row Carousel. It has 43 horses, with 12 elaborately carved outside row standing horses and 31 jumping horses. There are five menagerie figures,  a lion, a tiger a deer, a giraffe, and a rare mule. Many of the jumpers were carved by Daniel Muller.

In 2003 the carousel was disassembled after the park closed for the winter. The ride was replaced with a HUSS Frisbee ride named Revolution in 2004. One reason for the ride's removal was that the ride was closed often due to low staffing and mechanical problems.

Current status 
The Ameri-Go-Round is in storage at the park. The ride is in storage crates near the lift hill for Superman Ultimate Flight.

Santa Clara Ameri-Go-Round 
Santa Clara's Ameri-Go-Round was Philadelphia Toboggan Company's 45th carousel, built in 1918. It was built for the Cincinnati Zoo, sold by the zoo to Great America in 1974 and debuted there when the park opened in 1976. It was taken out of service in 1995 to make way for the Drop Zone Stunt Tower attraction. In 2000, it was announced that Linda and Tom Allen had arranged to donate it to Woodland Park Zoo in Seattle. After a pavilion was constructed for it, it debuted there in 2006.

References

External links 
Ameri-Go-Round history
Carousel Fact Sheet (Woodland Park Zoo)
Fontaine Ferry Carousel photos
Santa Clara's Ameri-Go-Round's Horses

Carousels in Washington (state)
Buildings and structures in Seattle
Amusement rides manufactured by Philadelphia Toboggan Coasters